Low information voters, also known as misinformation voters, are people who may vote yet are generally poorly informed about issues. The phrase is mainly used in the United States and has become popular since the mid-1990s.

Origins 
American pollster and political scientist Samuel Popkin coined the term "low-information" in 1991 when he used the phrase "low-information signaling" in his book The Reasoning Voter: Communication and Persuasion in Presidential Campaigns. Low-information signaling referred to cues or heuristics used by voters in lieu of substantial information to determine whom to vote for. Examples include voters liking Bill Clinton for eating at McDonald's and perceiving John Kerry and Barack Obama as elitist for wind-surfing and golfing, respectively.

Meaning 
The ideological views of most low-information voters tend to be more moderate than those of high-information voters. Low-information voters are less likely to vote and when they do they generally vote for a candidate they find personally appealing. They tend to be swing voters and they tend to vote split-ticket more than well-informed voters do. Researchers attribute this to low-information voters not having developed clear cut ideological preferences.

Linguist George Lakoff has written that the term is a pejorative mainly used by American liberals to refer to people who vote conservative against what liberals assume to be their own interests and assumes they do it because they lack sufficient information. Liberals, he said, attribute the problem in part to deliberate Republican efforts at misinforming voters.

In a 2011 article titled "Goodbye to All That: Reflections of a GOP Operative Who Left the Cult", thirty-year Republican House of Representatives and Senate staffer Mike Lofgren characterized low-information voters as anti-intellectual and hostile-to-science "religious cranks" and claimed Republicans are deliberately manipulating low information voters to undermine their confidence in American democratic institutions.

A 2012 paper by six American political scientists called "A Theory of Political Parties: Groups, Policy Demands and Nominations in American Politics" challenged the idea that Republicans want a low-information electorate and argued instead that both major American parties do. Noting that 95% of incumbents in the highly polarized House of Representatives win re-election despite voters' preference for centrist representation, the paper theorizes that voters' infrequent penalizing of extremist behaviour represents not approval, but a lack of attention and information. This, the paper says, is supported by the fact that when congressional districts and media markets overlap to create more informed electorates, extremist House members are at much greater risk for defeat. The paper proposes that in the American political system interest groups and activists are the key actor and that the electorate is uninformed and bamboozled.

Effects 
A 1992 study found that in the absence of other information voters used candidates' physical attractiveness to draw inferences about their personal qualities and political ideology. A study performed using logistic regression analysis on data from the 1986 through 1994 American National Election Studies found that low-information voters tend to assume female and black candidates are more liberal than male and white candidates of the same party. A 2003 study that analyzed precinct-level data from city council elections held in Peoria, Illinois between 1983 and 1999 found that the placement of candidates' names on the ballot was a point of influence for low-information voters. An analysis concerned with the "puzzling finding" that incumbent legislators in mature democracies charged with corruption are not commonly punished in elections found that less-informed voters were significantly more likely to vote for incumbents accused of corruption than were their better-informed counterparts, presumably because they did not know about the allegations.

Voting correctly 
Related to the concept of a low information voter, voting correctly is a concept from political psychology that refers to a vote decision "that is the same as the choice which would have been made under conditions of full information." Measurements of correct votes are used to determine how accurate low information voters are at determining the candidate or party that best represents the voters' interests.

See also 
 Antiscience
 Populism
 Useful idiot

References

Elections
Political terminology
Information
Voting theory
Voting in the United States